Samuel Jones (born June 2, 1935, Inverness, Mississippi) is an American composer and conductor.

Biography

Samuel Jones, a native of Mississippi (b. 1935), graduated from the Central High School in Jackson and received his undergraduate degree with highest honors at Millsaps College. He acquired his professional training at the Eastman School of Music, where he earned his M.A. and Ph.D. degrees in composition under Howard Hanson, Bernard Rogers, and Wayne Barlow. His mentors in conducting include Richard Lert and William Steinberg.

Jones enjoyed his earliest success as a conductor, advancing through the ranks of smaller American orchestras to become music director of the Rochester Philharmonic. He was then asked to help found a significant new music school in Houston, Texas. He served as the first dean of the Shepherd School of Music at Rice University, building its faculty and facilities over six years as dean. Jones continued to serve as professor of composition and conducting after stepping down as dean, while serving as director of graduate studies. Jones influenced a number of conductors and composers through his work as a teacher at Rice and in workshops of the Conductors Guild and League of American Orchestras. His students include a number of accomplished composers and conductors, including Gabriela Lena Frank, Larry Rachleff and Andrew Levin.

In 1997 Jones was appointed Composer-in-Residence at the Seattle Symphony. He retired from full-time academic life after 24 years at Rice to relocate to the Pacific Northwest and dedicate more of his attention to composition.

Samuel Jones's compositions include an oratorio and three symphonies as well as shorter orchestral works, works for chorus and orchestra, opera, chamber music and works for children. One of his proudest achievements, which he mentioned to a Huffington Post reporter in 2015, was the unlikely feat of persuading author Truman Capote to allow him to set Capote's iconic story, A Christmas Memory, as an opera, which debuted in Dallas in 1992 and for which he wrote the libretto. 

His music has been performed by the Philadelphia Orchestra, the Seattle Symphony, the Detroit Symphony, the Utah Symphony, the Houston Symphony, the Cincinnati Symphony, the Rochester Philharmonic Orchestra, the Louisville Orchestra, the New Orleans Philharmonic, the Beaverton Symphony Orchestra and many others. His violin concerto was premiered in 2015 by Anne Akiko Meyers with the All-Star Orchestra conducted by Gerard Schwarz (online).  His music is published by Carl Fischer and Campanile Music Press and is recorded by Naxos, CRI, Gasparo, ACA, and Centennial Records.

Jones’s work as a conductor includes serving as conductor of the Rochester Philharmonic Orchestra and Saginaw Symphony Orchestra. He has been engaged as a guest conductor by the Detroit Symphony Orchestra, the Houston Symphony Orchestra, the Pittsburgh Symphony Orchestra, the Buffalo Philharmonic, the Prague Symphony Orchestra, and the Iceland Symphony Orchestra. Early in his career he founded the Alma Symphony and the Delta College Summer Festival of Music in Michigan. He serves as music advisor to the Flint Symphony Orchestra in Michigan.

Samuel Jones has served as president of the Conductors Guild and received numerous awards and prizes. These include a Ford Foundation Recording/Publication Award, grants from Martha Baird Rockefeller Foundation and National Endowment for the Arts grants, ASCAP awards, an International Angel Award, three Music Awards from the Mississippi Institute of Arts and Letters, and the Seattle Symphony's 2002 Artistic Recognition Award for outstanding service to the orchestra. Millsaps College awarded him an honorary doctorate in May 2000. The same year he was inducted into the inaugural class of the Mississippi Musicians Hall of Fame. He was recently named the Music Alive Composer in Residence for the Meridian Symphony Orchestra by Meet The Composer and the League of American Orchestras.

Works

Theater
A Christmas Memory
The Temptation of Jesus

Orchestral

Aurum Aurorae
Chaconne and Burlesque
Chorale-Overture for Organ and Orchestra
Elegy
Fanfare and Celebration
Festival Fanfare
In Retrospect
Janus
Let Us Now Praise Famous Men
Listen Now, My Children
Overture for a City
Roundings: Musings and Meditations on Texas New Deal Murals
Three Suites From Roundings
I: Hymn To The Earth
II: Machines
III: The Open Range
Symphony No. 1
Symphony No. 3 (Palo Duro Canyon)
A Symphonic Requiem (Variations on a Theme of Howard Hanson)

Chorus and orchestra

Canticles of Time (Symphony No. 2)
Eudora’s Fable: The Shoe Bird
Gaudeo
Reunion Benediction
The Seas of God (Fanfare-Overture)
The Trumpet of the Swan

Concerti

Tuba Concerto
Horn Concerto
Concerto for Trombone and Orchestra
Concerto for Violoncello and Orchestra
Concerto for Violin and Orchestra

Solo and chamber

Four Haiku
How Do I Love Thee?
Piano Sonata
Sonata for Cello and Piano
Sonata for Unaccompanied Viola (In the Style of J.S. Bach)
Spaces for Unaccompanied Cello & Narrator
Two Movements for Harpsichord

References

 Biography in Mississippi Writers and Musicians
 Samuel Jones official site

External links
Samuel Jones' page at Carl Fischer
Samuel Jones official site
Seattle Symphony
Shepherd School of Music, Rice University
Rochester Philharmonic Orchestra

1935 births
20th-century classical composers
21st-century classical composers
Millsaps College alumni
Eastman School of Music alumni
Rice University faculty
Texas classical music
Living people
People from Sunflower County, Mississippi
Classical musicians from Mississippi
Pupils of Howard Hanson
American male classical composers
American classical composers
Pupils of Bernard Rogers
21st-century American composers
20th-century American composers
20th-century American male musicians
21st-century American male musicians